A Simple Matter of Conviction is an album by jazz pianist Bill Evans, released in 1967 on Verve.

Reception

Writing for Allmusic, music critic Bob Rusch wrote of the album: "What separated this from the average good Bill Evans date was the inclusion of Shelly Manne on drums, who inventively pushed and took unexpected chances."

Track listing
"A Simple Matter of Conviction" (Bill Evans) - 3:18
"Stella by Starlight" (Washington, Young) - 4:10
"Unless It's You (Orbit)" (Evans) - 3:42
"Laura" (Mercer, Raksin) - 4:20
"My Melancholy Baby" (Ernie Burnett, George Norton, W. E. Watson) - 5:16
"I'm Getting Sentimental Over You" (Bassman, Washington) - 4:13
"Star Eyes" (Gene de Paul, Don Raye) - 4:59
"Only Child" (Evans) - 4:05
"These Things Called Changes" (Evans) - 3:33

Credits
 Bill Evans - piano
 Eddie Gómez - bass
 Shelly Manne - drums

References

External links
Jazz Discography entries for Bill Evans
Bill Evans Memorial Library discography

Bill Evans albums
1967 albums
Verve Records albums
Albums produced by Creed Taylor
Albums recorded at Van Gelder Studio